The following is a list of episodes of the Canadian sitcom Life with Derek, which also appeared on Disney Channel. The show premiered on September 18, 2005 and ended its run on March 25, 2009, spanning 4 seasons, with 70 episodes produced.

Series overview

Episodes

Season 1 (2005–06)
 This season was filmed in Corner Brook, Newfoundland and Labrador.

Season 2 (2006)
 Starting with this season, the series was taped in Toronto, Ontario.

Season 3 (2007–08)

Season 4 (2008–09)

Series finale (2010)

Spin-off film (2023)

References

External links
 

Lists of Canadian children's television series episodes
Lists of Canadian comedy television series episodes
Lists of Disney Channel television series episodes
Lists of sitcom episodes
Lists of Canadian sitcom episodes